Rowton may refer to:

Places in England
Rowton, Cheshire
Rowton, Shropshire
Rowton Castle, a Grade II listed building in Shropshire

Other uses
Battle of Rowton Heath, a battle during the English Civil War
Montagu Corry, 1st Baron Rowton, Victorian philanthropist
Rowton Houses, a chain of hostels founded by Lord Rowton
Rowton (horse), a Thoroughbred racehorse

See also